Robert Johnson (born October 24, 1951) is a Canadian former handball player who competed in the 1976 Summer Olympics.

Born in Montreal, Quebec, Johnson was part of the Canadian handball team which finished eleventh in the 1976 Olympic tournament. He played two matches.

References
 profile

1951 births
Living people
Sportspeople from Montreal
Canadian male handball players
Olympic handball players of Canada
Handball players at the 1976 Summer Olympics